Antarut is a village in the Ashtarak Municipality of the Aragatsotn Province of Armenia.

References 

Report of the results of the 2001 Armenian Census

Populated places in Aragatsotn Province